Lake Julius was formed following the construction of Julius Dam in 1976 for irrigation and town water storage. The dam wall is located just below the junction of the Leichhardt River and Paroo Creek some  North East of Mount Isa.

The dam is unique in Queensland and is a concrete multiple arch and buttress type structure, with the spillway discharging over the tops of the arches. The arch barrels, founded on a triangular arch base, are constructed in independent arch rings and are hinged at buttress springing lines. The spillway is a precast superstructure and the dissipation slab at ground level is post tensioned to the foundation rock.

After recording its lowest level of 0% in September 2002, the dam filled to a maximum of 169.73% of capacity on January 15, 2004, after record breaking rainfall upstream at Mt Isa.

SunWater is undertaking a dam spillway capacity upgrade program.

See also

List of dams and reservoirs in Australia

References

North West Queensland
Reservoirs in Queensland